Robert Smith (born 15 December 1912 or 1913, date of death unknown) was an English footballer and manager born in Atherton, near Wigan, Lancashire. After early trials with Bolton Wanderers he played three seasons, from 1931 to 1934 with Bolton before leaving to join Huddersfield Town.

Personal life
Robert was born in Atherton, the son of Louisa Jane Cowburn and Joseph Smith.

References

1910s births
Year of death missing
English footballers
Bolton Wanderers F.C. players
Huddersfield Town A.F.C. players
People from Atherton, Greater Manchester
Footballers from Greater Manchester
English football managers
English expatriate football managers
English expatriate sportspeople in the Netherlands
Expatriate football managers in the Netherlands
Association footballers not categorized by position